Yoshinori Katsumata (勝又 慶典, born December 7, 1985) is a Japanese football player for Ococias Kyoto AC.

Club statistics
Updated to 23 February 2020.

1Includes J2/J3 Playoffs and 2019 Japanese Regional Promotion Series.

References

External links

Profile at Nagano Parceiro

1985 births
Living people
Toin University of Yokohama alumni
Association football people from Shizuoka Prefecture
Japanese footballers
J2 League players
J3 League players
Japan Football League players
FC Machida Zelvia players
Tochigi SC players
AC Nagano Parceiro players
Ococias Kyoto AC players
Association football forwards